The Ministry of Tourism and Sports of the Republic of Croatia is the ministry in the Government of Croatia which is in charge of the development of tourism.

List of ministers

Notes
 nb 1.  As Minister of Tourism and Trade
nb 2.  As Minister of Tourism and Trade (3 April 1993 – 20 May 1993); as Minister of Tourism (20 May 1993 – 11 September 1997)
nb 3.  As Minister of the Sea, Tourism, Transport and Development

Ministers of Tourism and Sports (2020–present)

References

External links
Official website 

Tourism
Croatia